The 2018 Anlas Czech Republic FIM Speedway Grand Prix was the second race of the 2018 Speedway Grand Prix season. It took place on May 26 at the Markéta Stadium in Prague, Czech Republic.

Riders 
The Speedway Grand Prix Commission nominated Václav Milík as the wild card, and Josef Franc and Eduard Krčmář both as Track Reserves.

Results 
The Grand Prix was won by Fredrik Lindgren, who beat Patryk Dudek, Emil Sayfutdinov and Tai Woffinden in the final. Woffinden has initially top scored with 14 points in the qualifying heats, dropping just one point to Artem Laguta, however he was beaten by Dudek in the semi-finals and then finished last in the final. Lindgren's win saw him maintain his lead in the overall world championship standings, two points ahead of Woffinden in second.

Heat details

Intermediate classification

References 

2018
Czech